Havelock North Intermediate is a middle school located in Havelock North, Hawke's Bay, New Zealand. The school was redeveloped in the mid-2000s, with a new administration block, media suite and performing arts centre.

References

External links

Schools in Hastings, New Zealand